Craig Drew (born 21 June 1983) is a British rally co-driver. He has won eight American Rally Association championships alongside David Higgins for Subaru Rally Team USA. He co-drove for Oliver Solberg in the 2021 World Rally Championship with Hyundai Motorsport.

Craig is competing in the 2022 WRC2 Championship with British driver Chris Ingram.

Rally results

WRC results

* Season still in progress.

References

External links

 Craig Drew's e-wrc profile

1983 births
Living people
British rally co-drivers
World Rally Championship co-drivers